Renato Valle was an alpine ski racer from Italy who participated to two editions of the Alpine World Ski Championships (1932, 1933).

Biography
Valle was from Cortina d'Ampezzo and in 1932 he founded the first Italian ski school in Roccaraso together with his brother Ferdinando and Paolino Pompanin.

World Championships results

References

External links
 Cortina contro Roccaraso nella guerra della neve 

Date of birth missing
Date of death missing
Italian male alpine skiers